The Miss Brazil 2014 was the 60th edition of the Miss Brazil pageant, held in Centro de Eventos do Ceará, Fortaleza, Ceará, Jakelyne Oliveira of Mato Grosso, crowned her successor Melissa Gurgel of Ceará. Delegates from each state and the Federal District for competed for the national crown. The winner represented Brazil in Miss Universe 2014 and placed Top 15.

Results

Placements

Special Awards
 The winner of the prize Miss Internet would go to semis.

Order of Announcements

Top 15

 Pará
 Paraná
 Amazonas
 Rio Grande do Norte
 Distrito Federal
 Santa Catarina
 Goiás
 Maranhão
 São Paulo
 Acre
 Amapá
 Rio de Janeiro
 Rio Grande do Sul
 Ceará
 Espírito Santo

Top 10

 Ceará
 Distrito Federal
 Rio Grande do Norte
 Rio Grande do Sul
 Santa Catarina
 São Paulo
 Amapá
 Amazonas
 Goiás
 Maranhão

Top 5

 Ceará
 São Paulo
 Rio Grande do Norte
 Amapá
 Goiás

Top 3

 São Paulo
 Rio Grande do Norte
 Ceará

Contestants

References

External links
Official Miss Brasil Website

2014
2014 in Brazil
2014 beauty pageants